Dominique Bussereau (born 13 July 1952) is a French politician.
He is president of the departmental council of Charente-Maritime since
2008 and president of the  since 2015.

He was Secretary of State for Transport within the government of François Fillon. Appointed to the post on 18 May 2007, he was previously Minister of Agriculture (2004–2007), Minister-Delegate for Aviation and Maritime Affairs (2002–2004) and Minister-Delegate for Budgets (2004).

Political career

Governmental functions 

 Secretary of State for Transport : 2007–2010.
 Minister of Agriculture, Fisheries, Food and Rural Affairs : 2004–2007.
 Secretary of State for the Budget : March–November 2004.
 Secretary of State for Transport and Sea : 2002–2004.

Electoral mandates

National Assembly of France 
MP of the Charente-Maritime's 4th constituency : 1986–1988 / 1993–2002 (Became secretary of State in 2002) / Re-elected in 2007, but he stays minister. Elected in 1986, re-elected in 1993, 1997, 2002, 2007, 2012.

Regional Council 
Regional councillor of Poitou-Charentes : 1992–1993 (Resignation) / March–April 2004 (Resignation) / March–September 2010 (Resignation). Re-elected in 2004, 2010.

Departmental Council 

 President of the Departmental Council of Charente-Maritime : Since 2008.
 General councillor of Charente-Maritime : Since 1985. Re-elected in 1992, 1998, 2004.

Municipal Council 

 Mayor of Saint-Georges-de-Didonne : 1989–2002 (Resignation). Re-elected in 1995, 2001.
 Deputy-mayor of Saint-Georges-de-Didonne : 2002–2008.
 Municipal councillor of Saint-Georges-de-Didonne : 1989–2008. Re-elected in 1995, 2001.
 Deputy-mayor of Royan : 1983–1989.
 Municipal councillor of Royan : 1983–1989.

Honours 
 2007 – Order of the Rising Sun, Grand Cordon (Japan).

References 

1952 births
Living people
Politicians from Tours, France
Republican Party (France) politicians
Liberal Democracy (France) politicians
Union for French Democracy politicians
Democratic Convention (France) politicians
The Republicans (France) politicians
French Ministers of Agriculture
French Ministers of Budget
Transport ministers of France
Recipients of the Order of the Rising Sun
Sciences Po alumni
Deputies of the 13th National Assembly of the French Fifth Republic
Deputies of the 14th National Assembly of the French Fifth Republic